Andriy Semenko (born 17 July 1993) is a Ukrainian football defender.

Career
Born in Kyiv Oblast, Semenko is a product of the two oblast's youth sportive schools.

Semenko played in the Ukrainian clubs of the different league levels, until June 2020, when he signed contract with the newly promoted to the Ukrainian Premier League FC Inhulets Petrove. He made his debut for Inhulets in the Ukrainian Premier League in a drawing home match against SC Dnipro-1 on 23 August 2020.

References

External links
Profile at UAF Official Site (Ukr)

1993 births
Living people
People from Fastiv
Ukrainian footballers
Association football defenders
FC Kolos Kovalivka players
FC Obolon-Brovar Kyiv players
FC Inhulets Petrove players
FC Mynai players
Ukrainian Premier League players
Ukrainian First League players
Ukrainian Second League players
Ukrainian Amateur Football Championship players
Sportspeople from Kyiv Oblast